Fordyce Rust Melvin (July 23, 1832 – January 4, 1915) was an American farmer, businessman, and politician.

Born in Chester Township, Geauga County, Ohio, Melvin moved to Cattaraugus County, New York in 1848. In 1851, Melvin moved to Green County, Wisconsin and settled in the town of Brooklyn. During the American Civil War, Melvin served in the 2nd Wisconsin Volunteer Infantry Regiment. He was wounded at Bull Run and was discharged. Melvin then enlisted in the 24th New York Volunteer Infantry Regiment and was again wounded. Melvin was a farmer and was an agent for the American Express Company; he also was involved with the fire insurance business and public conveyance. Melvin served as county treasurer for Green County and was a Republican. In 1879, Melvin served in the Wisconsin State Assembly. Melvin died at his home in Brooklyn, Wisconsin.

Notes

1832 births
1915 deaths
People from Cattaraugus County, New York
People from Geauga County, Ohio
People from Green County, Wisconsin
People of New York (state) in the American Civil War
People of Wisconsin in the American Civil War
Businesspeople from Wisconsin
Farmers from Wisconsin
County officials in Wisconsin
19th-century American politicians
Republican Party members of the Wisconsin State Assembly